"The Serpent" is the second episode of the American TV series Da Vinci's Demons. It picked up after the end of first episode with da Vinci performing an autopsy on the body of the hanged man.

Ron Hogan, from Den of Geek, said it is a "good television show, but two episodes in it hasn't emerged from the sketchbook into the realm of reality".

It got 0.503 million viewers in United States.

Cast

References

External links
 

2013 American television episodes
Television episodes set in Italy
Alternate history television episodes
Starz original programming
Fox Broadcasting Company original programming
BBC Worldwide